Alejo Garza Tamez (1933 – 14 November 2010), better known as Don Alejo was a Mexican businessman, rancher, and recreational hunter. Don Alejo gained notoriety after making a last stand against the Los Zetas cartel, in defense of his ranch, near Ciudad Victoria, in Tamaulipas.

Biography 
Alejo Garza Tamez was born in 1933 in Allende, Nuevo León, a town located around 50 kilometers south of Monterrey. Tamez spent most of his childhood in the wooded hills of Nuevo León. Alejo's father owned a sawmill and together with his brothers, helped his father harvest and sell lumber at their stores in Montemorelos and Allende.

Alejo gained a positive reputation for working hard and being reliable. Many friends and relatives would state that "a promise from Don Alejo was as good as a contract." Alejo assisted members of his local community through the promotion of poultry farming as a replacement for nearby ailing orange plantations.

Since childhood, Alejo was an enthusiastic hunter and fisherman, helping in the establishment of a hunting, fishing and shooting club in Allende. Alejo gained a reputation as a good marksman, and particularly specialized in hunting doves, geese and deer. Subsequently, he began to acquire a large collection of sporting rifles.

Alejo, with the assistance of his brother, bought the "San José" ranch in Tamaulipas, located 15 kilometers from Ciudad Victoria.

Ranch siege 
Members of the Los Zetas cartel demanded Alejo hand over his ranch property on the 13th of November 2010, giving him 24 hours to comply. Alejo, aged 77, refused to hand the property over. He rounded up the farm workers and ordered them to take the next day off. Alejo then took his firearms from his personal cellar  and placed the weapons by his doors and windows, utilizing his large collection of hunting and sporting weapons.

The following morning the cartel vehicles entered the ranch and were placed near the entrance to Alejo's house. The assassins fired a warning shot into the air, and proclaimed that they would forcefully seize the ranch. Garza Tamez responded with gunfire, and thus the armed gang responded by opening fire on the house, using rifles and grenades. Despite the numerical superiority of the cartel members, they were unable to take the ranch and fled before the arrival of Mexican Marines. Don Alejo took cover in the farm house, killing four of the attackers, while wounding two others.

Mexican Navy units entered the property to find a deserted house partially destroyed by bullet holes and grenade explosions. They found six abandoned bodies on the outside of the farm, four dead and two unconscious. Inside the house they found only the body of Alejo Garza Tamez sustaining 2 bullet wounds, one in the chest and the other in the head.

Upon inspection of the ranch house, it was revealed that guns and shell casings were found in all the windows and doors. It was understood that Alejo had designed his strategy to fight alone, placing weapons on all doors and windows.

Upon inspection, it was determined that Tamez sustained serious injuries from grenade shrapnel and subsequently died before the arrival of  the marines.

Aftermath 
Initially, many local media institutions deferred publishing news of the siege, due to the administrative power of the Los Zetas cartel. However, the Milenio newspaper widely reported on the events, with the story quickly spreading throughout Mexican social media sites. Don Alejo quickly became a cultural icon for his efforts in defending himself against organised crime.

Despite the significant media attention, no investigation into Alejo's murder has taken place, or any charges be issued against the Los Zetas cartel.

However, Alejo remains a prominent cultural icon, with several news sites describing Alejo as "fighting with dignity, honour and courage".

In popular culture 

 Various Mexican musicians have composed corridos in remembrance of Alejo.
 American writer Don Winslow novelized Alejos stand in his book The Cartel (2015).
 Alejo is the subject of the independent film "Massacre in San Jose", by Mexican director Edgar Nito.
 In 2019, Italian Comics Publisher, Panini Cómics published a story "El Viejo y El Narco" (The Old Man and the Narco).

References 

Mexican businesspeople
1933 births
2010 deaths
Deaths by firearm in Mexico